Ealing Grove was a mansion and estate in Ealing, Middlesex, west London, England. It was adjacent to the Ealing House estate, but distinct from it, and stood amongst trees.

The house was converted into an Italianate villa by the younger Joseph Gulston in the 1770s. It was demolished circa 1850.

Owners and tenants
From 1608, Sir William Fleetwood as tenant
John Maynard as tenant
1657 Joseph and Sarah Wadlowe acquired it from Sir Thomas Soame and his son Stephen
1675 acquired by Robert Welstead
Richard Savage, 4th Earl Rivers to 1712
Bessy, wife of Frederick Nassau de Zuylestein, 3rd Earl of Rochford, owner in 1722
Richard Savage Nassau, who sold it in 1746
1750 Mary Swift and Amy Peters
1754 Capt Edward Hughes
1755–1766 Joseph Gulston, snr, M.P. for Poole (bought and occupied)
1766–1775 Joseph Gulston, jnr, M.P. for Poole (inherited and occupied)
1775 George Spencer, 4th Duke of Marlborough (bought for £12,000)
John Campbell, 5th Duke of Argyll
1791 James Baillie (died 1793). 
Colina Baillie, his wife
Alexander Baillie, their son.
1799–1802 Edward Harley, 5th Earl of Oxford as tenant
1805 Charles Wyatt (to at least 1845).
c.1850 House demolished

Notes

 

Country houses in London
Buildings and structures demolished in 1850
Houses in the London Borough of Ealing